The Axemen is a New Zealand indie rock band formed in 1983. They played at the protests for homosexual law reform in 1983, where member Little Stevie McCabe was severely beaten up in the Christchurch Cathedral Square toilets.

The Axemen's founding members, Bob Brannigan, Little Stevie McCabe, and Stu Kawowski, played in various bands, apart and together, in the South Island cities of Christchurch and Dunedin.

Before Brannigan and McCabe met, the latter was playing in a two-piece band at Cashmere High School called The Gorillas with Peter Rees, evolving comix maestro and classical guitarist.

Brannigan and McCabe met through a mutual friend and played gigs in Christchurch. They played together under many names including The Whining Plums, Hey, We're Wolves and The Twins in the early '80s. At a Twins gig at the Empire Tavern in Dunedin in 1983, Kawowski joined the band when he jumped on stage to play the bongos.

Art School Photography graduate, photography guru, filmmaker, artist, promotional maverick and explosives expert Kawowski was playing drums with Above Ground, Bill Direen's band, at the time he met the other members of the Axemen and joined the band permanently.

While Brannigan, McCabe and Kawowski remained the core of the Axemen throughout the 20th century, many other New Zealand musicians played with them over the years in various roles, sharing ideas and making the band an important influence in Kiwi music circles.

In February 2009, US record label Siltbreeze re-released the Axemen's 1984 protest album "Big Cheap Motel"  on 12 vinyl. Originally the album was released as a cassette packaged in a small bubble-sleeve with a straw, mimicking the milk drink "Big M" that the album was aimed at. The Axemen were invited to play at Christchurch's "Summertimes" Festival in January 1984, a public music stage set up in Hagley Park, Christchurch. The band was shocked by the large-scale sexist "Big M" advertising surrounding the main stage, and decided to write a suite of protest songs about how the Christchurch City Council had "sold out" to the "Big M" sexist marketing. The Axemen recorded the concert, as well as studio versions of their songs and released a 45 min cassette entitled, "Big Cheap Motel". Siltbreeze later the same year re-released 'Scary! pt III', an experimental album featuring small-form collaborations with sublime Chch artist Lissa Bruce, and multiple band incarnations from the late 1980s and early 1990s.

A four piece Axemen (McCabe, Brannigan, Kawowski & Stojanovic) toured the United States for five weeks in October and November 2009, opening for Times New Viking Starting out on the West Coast in Sacramento October 27, travelling down the West Coast, across the South, up the east to New York then heading west and ending in Chicago on November 28.The band played 26 shows and covered approx 7,000 miles on the tour.

The Axemen's debut 2xLP "Three Virgins :: Three Versions:: Three Visions" was re-issued and released on June 7, 2011 by Siltbreeze. This album was originally released on New Zealand label Flying Nun Records in 1985. The first pressing was 667 copies made at the now closed EMI pressing plant in Lower Hutt, NZ. A mint copy of the 1985 vinyl was "needle drop" transferred to digital files at Shadoks Music Studio, Amrum, Germany. Then it was mastered at Fir International, Zaandam, Netherlands, and lacquers cut at Prairie Cat Mastering, Belvidere, Illinois, U.S. The vinyl was pressed at Record Technology Inc., in Camarillo, California, U.S.

A four-piece AXEMEN incarnation featuring McCabe, Kawowski, Stojanovic and newcomer William Daymond toured Australia in December 2011, a new line up that added William Daymond on bass guitar, allowing Dragan Stojanovic to resume his lead guitar duties. Bob Brannigan declined an invitation to join the band on this tour, due to irreconcilable differences with Steve McCabe. Originally the band was to headline a festival in Wandella, South NSW, but due to bureaucratic red tape, this festival was cancelled. The organiser Samuel Miers then proceeded to book the Axemen into 10 dates starting in Brisbane, and ending in Adelaide on December 23. Midway during the Australian tour Steve McCabe's shoulder was fractured after he was attacked by a wild Australian punter.

In 2012, the Axemen headlined a Christchurch 1980s reunion concert at the Dux Live venue in Christchurch, and also did a mid-winter pair of shows at Mighty Mighty in Wellington June 22, and Wunderbar Lyttleton on June 22.

The 'Class of 2011' Axemen (McCabe, Kawowski, Stojanovic, Daymond) recorded a new vinyl album Sac Tap Nut Jam in Wellington in 2013, which was released through Spacecase Records, California.

2014 saw the re-release of 1989's Derry Legend on vinyl by Luxury Products USA after 100% analogue re-mastering by Angus McNaughton of Auralax Mastering in Auckland. The re-release package contained a newsprint poster and single sheet fold-out newsprint collection of media reviews and photos from the Axemen archives. The re-issue was also available as an audio CD, and as a compact cassette.

Members
 Little Stevie McCabe – songwriter / singer / guitarist / keyboardist / vocalist / percussionist / bassist / recording technician
 Bob Brannigan AKA Robert Cardy – songwriter / singer / guitarist / keyboardist / vocalist / percussionist / bassist / music teacher / librarian
 Stu Kawowski AKA Stuart Page – drummer / percussionist / photographer / screenprinter / promotions, hustling for gigs, award-winning documentary film maker
 Johnny Segovia AKA Rent Hamilton – seminal Christchurch session musician and member of just about every band in Christchurch at the time including The Axel Grinders and The Connoisseurs
 Doug Hamilton – songwriter and member of The Connoisseurs
 'Shorty' Hamilton – bass player, The Axel Grinders and The Connoisseurs
 Patrick Faigin – songwriter and drummer, Say Yes To Apes, The Axel Grinders
 M. S. Agro AKA Mick Elborado – taxman, bass player for almost every original rock band in Christchurch including The Renderers, The McGoohans, Ritchie Venus and the Blue Beetles, Scorched Earth Policy, The Terminals, Shadow of the Valley.
 Gordon Baird – fruitarian, square jawed bass player, formerly of White Noize, legendary radical Dunedin vegan band, animal rights activists and motorcycle enthusiasts where he played with brother Martin
 B.B. Ryan – guitarist of White Noize
 Gary Scott – session horn player
 Arthur Sheep – sax appeal
 Al Wright – sax appeal
 Peter Hall-Jones – communist, writer, trumpet-player
 Joanne Billesdon – bassist of The Thunderbirds, Demolition, Loliners
 Sharon Billesdon – Loliners
 Bev E. Rage – guitarist and singer, The Thunderbirds
 Screamin K Hawkins – guitarist, of Shoes This High
 Jessica Walker – violist, Shoes This High
 Lisa Preston – keyboards, backing vocals Nux Vomica, Loliners
 Angela Dawson – vocalist, Scab Union
 Reta le Quesne – vocalist, Axel Grinders, The Wrongdoings
 Haydn Jones – drummer, The Renderers
 Dragan Stojanovic – Guitarist, backing vocals Vas Deferens
 Lissa Bruce – Singer, keyboardist, muse
 George D. Henderson – Keyboards and backing vocals And Band, The Puddle
 Chris Knox – The Enemy, Toy Love, Tall Dwarfs
 Peter Gutteridge – Keyboards, of The Clean, Snapper
 Richard (Dick's Riff) Cotton of EOE
 Billy Naylor of EOE
 Elron Hubbard AKA Zeberdee Holdall of Nux Vomica, also The National Sex Grid
 Brent Hayward – Dancer, vocalist of Shoes This High
 Davey G – Dancer, of Gestalt, The Rainy Days, Marty Sauce and the Source, EOE
 Gaylene – percussion, of Gaylene and the Undertakers
 Rich Mixture – Drums, supplementary guitar, bass, of Gestalt, The Rainy Days, Marty Sauce and the Source, The D4
 Larence Shustak(1926–2003) – recording engineer 3 Virgins, School of Fine Arts (Univ of Canty) Photography professor, musicologist, Stu's muse, subject of Stu's multi-award-winning documentary 'Shustak'
 Nick Roughan – recording engineer, producer Derry Legend, The Skeptics
 Jed Town – producer, 3 Virgins, Peter Wang Pud, Fetus Productions, JedEye, The Invisible Man, Ghost Town, ICU, Sawtooth Recordings, The Features
 Z. Bob – producer, recording engineer of Frisbee Records
 Matt Middleton – Sax, Keyboards, The Aesthetics
 Russel Covini – Drums, Loliners, the Aesthetics
 William Daymond – Bass, Guitar, keyboard, drums, other duties as required under employment contracts act Terror of the Deep, The Pickups, Green Eyed Owl

Brannigan currently plays in Shaft, the band he formed with Kawowski, Johnny Segovia and Danny Mañeto in Auckland 1992. (Kawowski, Segovia and Mañeto are no longer in the lineup, which is ever-changing but is currently made up of members of The Situations).

Notes

References
The Axemen's Y2K Blog
Axemen Tour Diary 2011
AXEMEN | Listen and Stream Free Music, Albums, New Releases, Photos, Videos on Myspace
AXEMEN on Facebook
FLYING NUN RECORDS
AXEMEN – AudioCulture
The Axemen's Y2K Blog
Axemen – Three Virgins, Three Versions, Three Visions
Axemen – Derry Legend
Axemen – Peter Wang Pud
Axemen – Big Cheap Motel
Axemen – Scary! Pt. III
Axemen / Times New Viking – Axemen / Times New Viking Tour Split
Axemen – Nutsack / Nut Shack Redemption Song

External links
 The Axemen’s Y2K Blog
The Axemen at amplifier.co.nz
 Steve McCabe's Diabolical Blog
 AudioCulture profile

New Zealand indie rock groups
Axemen, The